The Afghanistan Premier League (APL), officially Gulbahar Afghanistan Premier League for sponsorship reasons, is a Twenty20 cricket franchise tournament run by the Afghanistan Cricket Board (ACB), held in the United Arab Emirates. The first edition of the tournament took place between 5 and 21 October 2018 at the Sharjah Cricket Stadium, with up to forty overseas players involved. Five teams have been selected to compete, named after regions of Afghanistan. In August 2018, the International Cricket Council (ICC) approved plans for the tournament.

Teams

Tournament seasons and results

APL overall season results

Overall team performances

Broadcasters
 Watan

References

 
2018 establishments in Afghanistan
Afghan domestic cricket competitions
Recurring sporting events established in 2018
Twenty20 cricket leagues